Peter Knaak (born October 28, 1942) was a provincial level politician from Alberta, Canada. He served as a member of the Legislative Assembly of Alberta from 1979 to 1982.

Political career
Knaak ran for a seat to the Alberta Legislature in the 1979 Alberta general election. He won the electoral district of Edmonton-Whitemud with a landslide to hold it for the Progressive Conservatives. Knaak retired from provincial politics after serving a single term in office at dissolution of the legislature in 1982.

References

External links
Legislative Assembly of Alberta Members Listing

Progressive Conservative Association of Alberta MLAs
Living people
1942 births